Nodeh Bam (also Romanized as Nodeh Bām; also known as Nodeh) is a village in Bam Rural District, Bam and Safiabad District, Esfarayen County, North Khorasan Province, Iran. At the 2006 census, its population was 985, in 296 families.

References 

Populated places in Esfarayen County